The Water Services Regulation Authority, or Ofwat, is the body responsible for economic regulation of the privatised water and sewerage industry in England and Wales. Ofwat's main statutory duties include protecting the interests of consumers, securing the long-term resilience of water supply and wastewater systems, and ensuring that companies carry out their functions and are able to finance them.

Ofwat primarily sets limits on the prices charged for water and sewerage services, taking into account proposed capital investment schemes (such as building new wastewater treatment works) and expected operational efficiency gains. The most recent review was carried out in 2014; reviews are carried out every five years, with the next due to take place in December 2019.

The Water Act 2014 extended retail competition to all non-household customers of English water companies from April 2017 and provided for possible future competition in wholesale markets. Ofwat's role includes regulating such water and wastewater markets and promoting effective competition wherever appropriate.

Ofwat consists of a board, plus an office of staff which carries out work delegated to them by the board.

The Environment Agency is responsible for environmental regulation, and the Drinking Water Inspectorate for regulating drinking water quality. Water in Northern Ireland is regulated by the Northern Ireland Authority for Utility Regulation, and the supply and treatment is carried out by the government-owned Northern Ireland Water. There is no separate charge for water for residents or companies in Northern Ireland. Instead, water is paid for by the rates system. The water industry regulator in Scotland is the Water Industry Commission for Scotland.

History 
Ofwat was set up in 1988, at the same time as 10 water authorities in England and Wales were privatised by flotation on the stock market. Its duties and powers are defined by the Water Industry Act 1991. The resulting companies are known as "water and sewerage companies"; this distinguishes them from around a dozen smaller companies which only provide water services, which were already in private hands in 1989 (having remained in private ownership since their creation in the 19th century). The water-only companies provide water to around 25% of the population in England and Wales.

Before 1 April 2006, all regulatory powers rested with the Director General of Water Services. The staff who supported the role of the Director General were collectively known as the "Office of Water Services", which was abbreviated to "Ofwat". Ian Byatt was the Director General between 1989 and 2000; Philip Fletcher was Director General until 2006 and chairman until 2012. On 1 April 2006, the Director General was replaced by the Water Services Regulation Authority. The name "Office of Water Services" is no longer used, as it had no legal basis.

Key people 
The current chairman is Jonson Cox, who took up his position in November 2012. The current interim chief executive (effective April 2021) is David Black, replacing Rachel Fletcher who was chief executive from January 2018. Iain Coucher will succeed Cox as chairman in July 2022.

Price reviews 
Every five years, Ofwat set limits on the prices which water companies in England and Wales can charge to their customers; this process is known as a price review or periodic review. Ofwat has carried out six price reviews so far – in 1994 (PR94), 1999 (PR99), 2004 (PR04), 2009 (PR09), 2014 (PR14) and 2019 (PR19). The most recent, PR19, set price limits for 2020–2025. Ofwat sets a so-called "K factor" in companies' licences which determine the average value of price rises above the rate of inflation (RPI) for the next five year asset management plan period.

See also 
 List of United Kingdom water companies
 Water supply and sanitation in England and Wales

References

External links 
 

Water supply and sanitation in England and Wales
Water in Wales
Regulators of the United Kingdom
2006 establishments in the United Kingdom
Organizations established in 2006